McMullin is a census-designated place in Smyth County, Virginia. The population as of the 2010 Census was 464.

Fox Farm site was listed on the National Register of Historic Places in 1978.

References

Census-designated places in Smyth County, Virginia
Census-designated places in Virginia